Anora is an upcoming Sri Lankan Sinhala drama thriller film directed by Hector Kumarasiri and co-produced by Chris Wickramasinge, Don Premadasa, Pulasthi Bethmage, Sarath Kumara Podinilame, Priyantha Kaluarachchi, and Sunil Dissanayake for A U M Films. It stars Menaka Madhuwanthi with Mahendra Perera and W. Jayasiri in lead roles along with Wijeratne Warakagoda and Dayadeva Edirisinghe. Music composed by Nimantha Heshan.

A special screening of the film was held at the Tharangani Hall in National Film Corporation. The film was scheduled to release in January 2020, but delayed few months according to director.

Plot

Cast
 Menaka Madhuwanthi as Anora 
 Mahendra Perera
 W. Jayasiri
 Wijeratne Warakagoda
 Gihan Fernando
 Dayadeva Edirisinghe
 Chithra Warakagoda
 Damayanthi Fonseka
 Hector Bethmage
 Ferni Roshini
 Daya Wayaman
 Sudharshana Bandara
 Udaya Kumari
 Nimantha Heshan
 M.G Dhanushka

References

External links
 

Sinhala-language films
Sri Lankan drama films